This is a partial list of churches in Greater Manchester, North West England, split according to metropolitan district. There is a mixture of Christian denominations in Greater Manchester, including churches aligned to Orthodox Christianity, Protestantism and Catholicism. Similarly, there is a range of ecclesiastical architecture.



Bolton

Bury

Manchester

Oldham

Rochdale

Salford

Stockport

Tameside

Trafford

Wigan

See also

Salford (hundred)
Manchester (ancient parish)
List of places in Greater Manchester
Anglican Diocese of Manchester
List of Roman Catholic churches in the Diocese of Salford
Anglican Diocese of Chester
Roman Catholic Diocese of Salford
Roman Catholic Diocese of Shrewsbury
Roman Catholic Archdiocese of Liverpool
Grade I listed buildings in Greater Manchester
Grade II* listed buildings in Greater Manchester

References

Bibliography

List
Greater Manchester
Churches in Greater Manchester